Follow the Girls is a musical with a book by Guy Bolton, Eddie Davis and Fred Thompson and music and lyrics by Dan Shapiro, Milton Pascal, and Phil Charig.

A major wartime hit in both New York City and London, its thin plot about a burlesque striptease queen who becomes the star attraction at the Spotlight, a servicemen's club in Great Neck, Long Island, serves as an excuse for a series of songs, dance numbers, and comedy routines.

Productions 
The Broadway production, produced by Albert Borde, conceived and directed by Harry Delmar and choreographed by Catherine Littlefield, opened on April 8, 1944 at the New Century Theatre. It transferred to the 44th Street Theatre and then the Broadhurst to complete its 888-performance run. The cast included Jackie Gleason, Danny Aiello, Walter Long, and Gertrude Niesen.

The West End production, presented by Jack Hylton, opened on October 25, 1945 at His Majesty's Theatre, where it ran for 572 performances. The cast included Arthur Askey and Evelyn Dall. 

The Australian production was presented by J. C. Williamson's and starred Don Nicol and Lois Green. The show opened at the Theatre Royal, Sydney on October 12, 1946. The Melbourne season commenced April 10, 1947 at Her Majesty's Theatre, followed by a Perth season commencing May 22, 1948 at His Majesty’s Theatre.

Song list

Act I
 At the Spotlight Canteen
 Where You Are
 You Don't Dance
 Strip Flips Hip
 Thanks for a Lousy Evening
 You're Perf
 Twelve O'Clock and All Is Well
 Out for No Good
 You Don't Dance (Reprise)
 Where You Are (Reprise)
 Follow the Girls

Act II
 John Paul Jones
 Where You Are (Reprise)
 I Wanna Get Married
 Today Will Be Yesterday Tomorrow
 You're Perf (Reprise)
 A Tree That Grows in Brooklyn

References

The Encyclopedia of the Musical Theatre by Stanley Green, published by Da Capo Press (1991), pages 131-32

External links
Internet Broadway Database listing

1944 musicals
Broadway musicals
West End musicals
Musicals by Fred Thompson (writer)